1979 Emperor's Cup Final was the 59th final of the Emperor's Cup competition. The final was played at National Stadium in Tokyo on January 1, 1980. Fujita Industries won the championship.

Overview
Fujita Industries won their 2nd title, by defeating defending champion Mitsubishi Motors 2–1.

Match details

See also
1979 Emperor's Cup

References

Emperor's Cup
1979 in Japanese football
Shonan Bellmare matches
Urawa Red Diamonds matches